Analyn Barro Tabucanon, also known by her stage name Analyn Barro and labeled as “Crush ng Bayan”  is a Filipina actress and model who became known after joining in the sixth season of GMA Network’s reality-based talent competition, StarStruck.

After her StarStruck journey, she landed her first regular show on the primetime series Once Again as Diana "Daday", the best friend of Des (played by Janine Gutierrez). She became an antagonist in the afternoon series Oh, My Mama. She played as a third wheel to the DerBea loveteam in the weekend primetime fantasy series Tsuperhero as the bubbly Visayan Anna. She also starred as Mina, the friend of Jennylyn Mercado's character, Steffi, in the hit Philippine television remake, My Love from the Star. She portrays Tina, best friend of Rachel (played by Kris Bernal) in the 2018 afternoon series Asawa Ko, Karibal Ko. She portrays Gemrose Reyes, the antagonist role as insecure, envious and jealous sister of Melody (played by Sanya Lopez) in the 2021 primetime series First Yaya and sequel First Lady.

Barro is currently a mainstay of the longest-running sketch comedy program in Philippine television, Bubble Gang.

Filmography 

Television Series

Television Anthologies

References 

 Tsuperhero actress Analyn Barro is a beach babe Retrieved 2017-06-14
 Analyn Barro eliminated in Starstruck Season 6 Retrieved 2017-06-14
 Tsuperhero stars Bea Binene, Analyn Barro are total beach babes Retrieved 2017-06-14
 Analyn Barro reveals she did not expect to pass the 'StarStruck' audition Retrieved 2017-06-14

Living people
21st-century Filipino actresses
Filipino female models
Filipino female dancers
Filipino television actresses
StarStruck (Philippine TV series) participants
People from Bacolod
Actresses from Negros Occidental
Hiligaynon people
1996 births